Line is a female given name, most common in the Nordic countries Denmark and Norway.
It may be a short form of names which end in -line, like Caroline. The Swedish form is Lina.
In Norway its Name day is 20 January.

People
Notable people with the name Line include:
Line Arlien-Søborg (born 1966), Danish actress and film director
Line Barfod (born 1964), member of the Folketing (Danish parliament)
Line Beauchamp (born 1963), Canadian politician
Line Daugaard (born 1978), Danish handball player
Line Haddad (born 1978), Jewish French pair skater
Line Hagman, Norwegian orienteering competitor
Line Halvorsen (born 1969), Norwegian film maker
Line Hamel, Canadian politician
Line Hansen, (born 1983), Danish professional squash player
Line Henriette Holten Hjemdal (born 1971), Norwegian politician  
Line Horntveth (born 1974), Norwegian musician
Line Jahr (born 1984), Norwegian ski jumper
Line Jensen (disambiguation), multiple people, including:
Line Jensen (triathlete) (born 1981), Danish triathlete
Line Jensen (footballer) (born 1991), Danish footballer
Line Johansen, Norwegian sport wrestler
Line Jørgensen (born 1989), Danish handball player
Line Kruuse, Danish beauty queen
Line Larsen (born 1996), Danish singer
Line Luplau (1823-1891), Danish feminist and suffragist
Line Maheux, Canadian communications consultant and political strategist
Line Monty (died 2003), Jewish Algerian singer
Line Noro (1900–1985), French stage and film actress
Line Østvold (1978–2004), Norwegian professional snowboarder
Line Renaud (born 1928), French singer, actress and AIDS activist
Line Røddik Hansen (born 1988), Danish football defender
Line Sørensen (born 1982), Danish pop singer
Line Van Wambeke (also known as Lyne Renée) (born 1979), Belgian actress
Line Vennesland (born 1985), Norwegian politician
Line Verndal (born 1972), Norwegian actress

External links
 Behind the name: Line

See also 

 Linet (given name)

Danish feminine given names
Norwegian feminine given names